Kim Yung-kil (born 29 January 1944) is a North Korean football defender who played for North Korea in the 1966 FIFA World Cup. He also played for Pyongyang Sports Club.

References

1944 births
North Korean footballers
North Korea international footballers
Association football defenders
1966 FIFA World Cup players
Living people
Pyongyang Sports Club players